Eriophyllum pringlei is a North American species of flowering plant in the family Asteraceae known by the common name Pringle's woolly sunflower. It is native to the southwestern United States (Arizona, Nevada, California) and northern Mexico (Baja California), where it grows in several types of desert, canyon, and hillside habitat, such as chaparral and sagebrush.

Eriophyllum pringlei is a petite annual herb no more than about 8 centimeters (3.2 inches) high, growing in woolly tufts. The lobed leaves are up to about a centimeter (0.4 inches) long and coated in white woolly fibers. The inflorescence is a cluster of flower heads filled with 10-20 golden yellow disc florets but no ray florets.

References

External links
Jepson Manual Treatment
United States Department of Agriculture Plants Profile
Calphotos Photo gallery, University of California

pringlei
Flora of California
Flora of the Southwestern United States
Flora of Baja California
Flora of the California desert regions
Natural history of the Mojave Desert
Natural history of the Peninsular Ranges
Natural history of the Transverse Ranges
Plants described in 1883
Taxa named by Asa Gray
Flora without expected TNC conservation status